C. formosa may refer to:

 Callipero formosa, a longhorn beetle
 Callista formosa, the floral emblem of Ranong Province, Thailand
 Calocitta formosa, a Central American jay
 Canna formosa, a garden plant
 Carcelia formosa, a tachina fly
 Cephalopholis formosa, a Pacific grouper
 Chacodelphys formosa, a didelphimorph marsupial
 Chloromyia formosa, a soldier fly
 Chrysanympha formosa, a North American moth
 Cirrimaxilla formosa, a saltwater eel
 Clavus formosa, a sea snail
 Coris formosa, a wrasse native to the Indian Ocean
 Cosmopterix formosa, a cosmet moth
 Crematogaster formosa, a cocktail ant
 Cuspivolva formosa, a sea snail
 Cyprinella formosa, a ray-finned fish